Abdan is a sub-district located in the Al-Misrakh District, Taiz Governorate, Yemen. Abdan had a population of 9,168 according to the 2004 census.

Villages
Al-Jirat.
Al-Mihal.
Al-Zawh.
Al-Mawasatuh. 
Al-Awrmh.

References

Sub-districts in Al-Misrakh District